Xueyuan is an officer cadet within the People's Liberation Army.  The rank was established in 1988 as part of the revival of the use of rank by the People's Liberation Army.  No equivalent rank existed in pre-Cultural Revolution system of rank used by the PLA between 1955 and 1965.

References 

Military ranks of the People's Republic of China